Alberto Alberti (1525 or 1526, Borgo Sansepolcro, Tuscany, Italy – 1598, Rome) was an Italian wood carver, architect, painter and diarist. His name also appears as Alberto di Giovanni Alberti and Berto di San Sepolcro. His three sons Alessandro, Giovanni and Cherubino (1533–1615) were all painters.

16th-century Italian sculptors
16th-century Italian painters
16th-century Italian architects
People from Sansepolcro
1525 births
1526 births
1598 deaths
Alberto